Surf, Isles of Shoals is a 1913 painting by Childe Hassam. Done in oil on canvas, the work depicts the rugged New England shoreline near Portsmouth, New Hampshire. The painting is currently in the collection of the Metropolitan Museum of Art.

See also
July Fourteenth, Rue Daunou, 1910 - another work by Hassam in the collection of the Metropolitan Museum of Art

References

1913 paintings
Paintings in the collection of the Metropolitan Museum of Art
Paintings by Childe Hassam
Water in art